West Ossipee is an unincorporated community in the town of Ossipee in Carroll County, New Hampshire, United States. It is located near the northern boundary of the town, along New Hampshire Route 16, leading north towards Conway and south towards Rochester.  Route 41 departs from the village, heading northeast to Silver Lake and Madison.  Route 25 leads west towards Tamworth and Moultonborough.  The Bearcamp River runs along the southwest side of the village. The Whittier Bridge is a historic covered bridge that crosses the river just west of the village.

West Ossipee has a separate ZIP code (03890) from the rest of Ossipee.

References

Unincorporated communities in Carroll County, New Hampshire
Unincorporated communities in New Hampshire
Ossipee, New Hampshire